Saurbæjarkirkja is a church in the Eyjafjörður region of Iceland.

Saurbæjarkirkja church has thick turf and stone walls on the outside for protection against the weather, and turf on the roof. 
It was built in 1858 by  Olaf Briem (1808-59), who studied carpentry in Copenhagen.
It is one of only six turf churches still extant in Iceland. 
Most churches in the country were built of this material until well into the 19th century.
Inside, the church has a wooden frame construction. Churches of this type had no tower, and the bells usually hung from the front gable.
Saurbæjarkirkja church is now under care of the National Museum of Iceland (Þjóðminjasafn Íslands).

References

External links
Saurbæjarkirkja on the Icelandic Church Map

Churches in Iceland